Bajkani is a Pakistani Baloch tribe living in the province of Sindh of Pakistan and some districts of Balochistan province as well.

References

Baloch tribes